The 1929–30 IHL season was the first season of the International Hockey League, a minor professional ice hockey league in the Midwestern United States and Canada. Eight teams participated in the league, and the Cleveland Indians won the championship.

Regular season

Playoffs

Semifinals

Best of 3

Buffalo beat Detroit 2 wins to 1.

Cleveland beat London 2 wins to none.

Final
Best of 5

Cleveland beat Buffalo 3 wins to 1.

External links
Season on hockeydb.com

1929 in ice hockey
1930 in ice hockey